Cerevisin (yeast proteinase B, proteinase yscB, baker's yeast proteinase B, brewer's yeast proteinase, peptidase beta) is an enzyme. This enzyme catalyses the following chemical reaction

 Hydrolysis of proteins with broad specificity, and of Bz-Arg-OEt  Ac-Tyr-OEt. Does not hydrolyse peptide amides

This enzyme is isolated from Saccharomyces cerevisiae (baker's yeast).

References

External links 
 

EC 3.4.21